Johann Rudolf Wolf (7 July 1816 – 6 December 1893) was a Swiss astronomer and mathematician best known for his research on sunspots.
 
Wolf was born in Fällanden, near Zurich. He studied at the universities of Zurich, Vienna, and Berlin. Encke was one of his teachers. Wolf became professor of astronomy at the University of Bern in 1844 and director of the Bern Observatory in 1847. In 1855 he accepted a chair of astronomy at both the University of Zurich and the Federal Institute of Technology in Zurich.

Wolf was greatly impressed by the discovery of the sunspot cycle by Heinrich Schwabe and he not only carried out his own observations, but he collected all the available data on sunspot activity back as far as 1610 and calculated a period for the cycle of 11.1 years. In 1848 he devised a way of quantifying sunspot activity. The Wolf number, as it is now called, remains in use. In 1852 Wolf was one of four people who discovered the link between the cycle and geomagnetic activity on Earth.

Around 1850, to study the laws of probability, Wolf performed a Buffon's needle experiment, dropping a needle on a plate 5000 times to verify the value of π, a precursor to the Monte Carlo method.

References

Further reading

External links

 HAO "Rudolf Wolf (1816–1893"
 MacTutor "Johann Rudolf Wolf"
 The Sun – History
 Analysis of Wolf's dice data by Edwin Jaynes

19th-century Swiss astronomers
1816 births
1893 deaths
Historians of astronomy
University of Zurich alumni
Academic staff of the University of Zurich
Academic staff of ETH Zurich
Members of the French Academy of Sciences